Marcos Lavín Rodríguez (born 2 September 1996) is a Spanish footballer who plays as a goalkeeper.

Club career
Lavín was born in Madrid, and finished his formation with Real Madrid. On 1 February 2016, he joined UD Logroñés after terminating his contract with Los Blancos, but only appeared with the reserves during his spell.

On 12 July 2016, Lavín signed for Atlético Saguntino in Segunda División B. A backup to Adrián Lluna, he moved to Córdoba CF on 23 June of the following year, being initially assigned to the B-side also in the third division.

Lavín was promoted to the first-team ahead of the 2018–19 campaign, as a backup to Carlos Abad, and renewed his contract until 2021 on 3 October 2018. He made his professional debut thirteen days later, starting in a 4–1 away routing of Elche CF for the season's Copa del Rey.

Lavín made his Segunda División debut on 3 November 2018, playing the full 90 minutes in a 4–2 home win against Extremadura UD. The following 1 August, after suffering relegation, he cut ties with the club.

References

External links

1996 births
Living people
Footballers from Madrid
Spanish footballers
Association football goalkeepers
Segunda División players
Segunda División B players
Divisiones Regionales de Fútbol players
UD Logroñés B players
Atlético Saguntino players
Córdoba CF B players
Córdoba CF players
Getafe CF B players
Liga I players
FC Voluntari players
Spanish expatriate footballers
Spanish expatriate sportspeople in Romania
Expatriate footballers in Romania